Three ships of the French Navy have borne the name Royal Hollandais in honour of the Kingdom of Holland, a puppet state created by Napoléon.

Ships named Royal Hollandais 
  (1810), a 16-gun brig.
 , a 90-gun .
 , a 74-gun .

Notes and references

Notes

References

Bibliography 
 

French Navy ship names